Yang Eun-hye (born July 25, 1987, Jeju Province) is a South Korean weightlifter. She competed at the 2012 Summer Olympics in the women's 58 kg, finishing 14th.

References

South Korean female weightlifters
1987 births
Living people
Olympic weightlifters of South Korea
Weightlifters at the 2012 Summer Olympics
Weightlifters at the 2010 Asian Games

Sportspeople from Jeju Province
Asian Games competitors for South Korea
20th-century South Korean women
21st-century South Korean women